Joseph John Tepsic (September 18, 1923 – February 23, 2009) was a Major League Baseball outfielder. He was 5'9", 170 pounds, and he threw and batted right-handed.

During World War II, Tepsic served in the United States Marines Corps and was wounded on Guadalcanal. He eventually recovered and went on to attend Penn State University, where he was an outstanding athlete in both football and baseball. After receiving a contract offer from the Brooklyn Dodgers, he left Penn State.

On July 12, 1946, at the age of 22 and wearing the number 32, Tepsic made his major league debut. He played in 15 games that year, collecting zero hits in five at-bats. Tepsic was used primarily as a pinch runner, appearing in only one game on the field. His performance on the field was overshadowed by disagreements with his teammates, who wanted him to go down to the minor leagues so the team could call up a veteran to pinch hit. However, Tepsic refused, citing a clause in his contract. The Dodgers finished in second place, two games behind the St. Louis Cardinals. Tepsic played his final major league game on October 1, 1946.

In , Tepsic was sent down to the minor leagues. Furious over the assignment and thinking he warranted a chance to prove himself at a major league level, Tepsic quit the Dodgers on April 3. He spent another five seasons in the minors before retiring from professional baseball.

Later in life, Tepsic worked in the logging industry and also as a state highway inspector.

Tepsic died on February 23, 2009, at the age of 85.

References

External links

1923 births
2009 deaths
Major League Baseball outfielders
Brooklyn Dodgers players
Baseball players from Pennsylvania
Penn State Nittany Lions football players
Penn State Nittany Lions baseball players
St. Paul Saints (AA) players
Fort Worth Cats players
Lancaster Red Roses players
Montreal Royals players
Newport News Dodgers players
Elmira Pioneers players
Harlingen Capitals players
United States Marine Corps personnel of World War II
United States Marines